Jason Podollan (born February 18, 1976) is a Canadian former professional ice hockey forward who played in the National Hockey League (NHL)

Playing career
Podollan was drafted 31st overall in the 1994 NHL Entry Draft by the Florida Panthers from the Western Hockey League's Spokane Chiefs.  He played in 41 games in the National Hockey League with the Florida Panthers, Toronto Maple Leafs, Los Angeles Kings, and New York Islanders.

In 2002, he moved to the Deutsche Eishockey Liga in Germany for Adler Mannheim where he spent three seasons before moving to experience one season with the Oji Eagles in the Asia League Ice Hockey before retiring in 2006.

Career statistics

Regular season and playoffs

International

Awards and honours

References

External links
 

1976 births
Living people
Adler Mannheim players
Bridgeport Sound Tigers players
Canadian ice hockey right wingers
Carolina Monarchs players
Cincinnati Cyclones (IHL) players
Detroit Vipers players
Florida Panthers draft picks
Florida Panthers players
Ice hockey people from British Columbia
Long Beach Ice Dogs (IHL) players
Los Angeles Kings players
Lowell Lock Monsters players
Manitoba Moose (IHL) players
New York Islanders players
Oji Eagles players
Penticton Panthers players
St. John's Maple Leafs players
Spokane Chiefs players
Sportspeople from Vernon, British Columbia
Toronto Maple Leafs players